Brunia may refer to:
 Brunia (moth), a genus of insects in the family Erebidae
 Brunia (plant), a genus of plants in the family Bruniaceae